Cacusan Clube do Futebol, commonly known as Cacusan is an East Timorese football club based in Dili. The team plays in the Liga Futebol Amadora.

Competition records

Liga Futebol Amadora 
2016 Segunda Divisao: Champions (promotion)

Taça 12 de Novembro
2016: 3rd Round

References

Football clubs in East Timor
Football